Holme Pierrepont Hall is a medieval Manor House in Holme Pierrepont near Nottingham. It is a Grade I listed building.

History

The Pierrepont family have lived at Holme Pierrepont since around 1280, following the marriage of Henry de Pierrepont to Annora de Manvers. Originally the area was known only as Holme, but later adopted the family surname as a suffix.

The house was built by Sir William Pierrepont around 1500. He was succeeded by Sir George Pierrepont (died 1564), Sir Henry Pierrepont (died 1616) and Sir Robert Pierrepont (died 1643), who was created 1st Earl of Kingston-upon-Hull. The north range of the house was rebuilt by the 1st Earl in 1628. His son Henry Pierrepont, 2nd Earl of Kingston-upon-Hull was created Marquess of Dorchester in 1645.

The family rose to be Dukes of Kingston in 1715 when the 5th Earl was created 1st Duke of Kingston-upon-Hull. By this time their principal seat was Thoresby Hall in the dukeries area on the other side of Nottingham, which the family had bought in 1633. Holme Pierrepont became a secondary house and was reduced in size. The 1st Earl's north range was demolished around 1730. After the Dukedom died out when the 2nd Duke died childless in 1773, the estate passed in 1788 to his nephew Charles Medows, a naval officer. Charles changed his surname to Pierrepont and was created 1st Earl Manvers in 1806. The 3rd Earl rebuilt the North Wing around 1870 and was succeeded by the 4th Earl.

The Hall was requisitioned for military purposes in both World Wars and left unoccupied between them. During the Second War, it was used as a base for training young soldiers of the 70th (YS) Sherwood Foresters after which it was reoccupied by Lady Sibell Argles, sister of the 5th Earl. After her death in 1968, it was sold to her cousin Mrs Elizabeth Brackenbury, who with her husband  Robin carried out a programme of renovation, including in 1975 the removal of the exterior stucco to reveal the original brickwork. Their son Robert Brackenbury also lives in a separate quarters in the house with his wife Charlotte.

Current use

Holme Pierrepont is regularly open to the public on a few days in February and March each year.  All house opening details can be found on the website.  The house is also now a luxury function venue, available for weddings and corporate events, and is used for filming and photo shoots.

Adjacent to the house is St. Edmund's Church, Holme Pierrepont.

References

  English Heritage: Images of England, 2005 photograph and 1952 description of listed building
The Buildings of England, Nottinghamshire. Nikolaus Pevsner

External links
Holme Pierrepont Hall website

Grade I listed buildings in Nottinghamshire
Country houses in Nottinghamshire
Historic house museums in Nottinghamshire
Pierrepont family